Only Honest on the Weekend is the debut studio album by English singer Becky Hill, released on 27 August 2021 through Eko and Polydor Records. The album was preceded by the release of five singles over the course of 2020 and 2021: "Better Off Without You", "Heaven on My Mind", "Last Time", "Remember" and "My Heart Goes (La Di Da)", all of which reached the top 40 of the UK Singles Chart. It includes collaborations with Shift K3Y, David Guetta, Topic, S1mba, Ella Eyre, Banx & Ranx, Sigala and 220 Kid. 

A deluxe edition, released in March, included the single "Run" featuring Galantis and was updated again in August 2022, with "History" with Joel Corry and "Crazy What Love Can Do", with Guetta and Ella Henderson.

Only Honest on the Weekend peaked at number seven on the UK Albums Chart and has been certified gold.

Critical reception
Alim Kheraj, reviewing Only Honest on the Weekend for The Guardian, gave the album one star out of five, describing its tracks as "seemingly designed for fast fashion adverts during Love Island, with over-stuffed production that's about as robust and long-lasting as the minidresses sold therein". Kheraj also summarised the album as "disposable" and a "conveyor belt of blandness" that makes one wonder why Hill "bothered to make" it as "[p]erhaps after waiting nearly a decade to be allowed to release an album, Hill's enthusiasm had just run dry". Conversely, Clashs Caitlin Sibthorpe scored the album seven out of 10, calling it an "unstoppable pop banger" with "sensational guest stars" and "faultless production" that make it "even more tantalizing". Sibthorpe felt that "the versatility of the album will produce mass adoration". Neil McCormick for The Telegraph awarded the album three stars out of five and found that while Hill "sings beautifully and has energy to burn", "this is more like a pop data dump than a crafted debut album".

Commercial performance

Only Honest on the Weekend debuted at number seven on the UK Album Charts and stayed in the top 100 for an initial 11 weeks. The album re-entered the chart in March 2022 at number 15  and returned to its peak position in August 2022 following Hill's performance at the final of the UEFA Women's Euro 2022 championship. The album also saw a resurgence in popularity on the Irish Album Charts as well reaching a new peak of number 5.

Track listing

Notes
  indicates an additional producer
  indicates a co-producer
  indicates a vocal producer

Personnel
Musicians

 Becky Hill – vocals (all tracks), background vocals (2)
 Ryan Ashley – background vocals (1, 2, 5–8, 11–14), vocal arrangement (13), vocal production (1, 2, 5–8, 11–14)
 Lostboy – drum programming, piano, synthesizer programming (2)
 Mark Ralph – keyboards, percussion, programming (2)
 Lucas Nord – programming (3)
 MK – programming (3)
 Jarly – keyboards (4, 13); bass, drums, guitar, piano, programming, sound effects, strings (4); drum programming (13)
 Svidden – bass, drums, guitar, keyboards, piano, programming, sound effects, strings (4)
 Luke Storrs – keyboards (5)
 MJ Cole – piano, programming (6, 11)
 Tobie Tripp – string arrangement (6, 11)
 Josh Wilkinson – bass, drums, keyboards, sound effects, strings, synthesizer (7)
 Tobias Topic – bass, percussion, synthesizer (7)
 Tom Hollings – bass programming, percussion (8)
 Sam Brennan – drum programming, synthesizer (8)
 S1mba – vocals (8)
 MNEK – background vocals, programming (9)
 Banx & Ranx – bass guitar, drums, programming, synthesizer (9, 12, 14); keyboards (12, 14)
 Ella Eyre – vocals (9)
 Clément Langlois-Légaré – guitar (12)
 Sigala – drum programming, keyboards (13)

Technical

 Stuart Hawkes – mastering engineer (1–4, 6–15)
 Peppe Folliero – mastering engineer (5)
 Serge Courtois – mixer (1, 10)
 Mark Ralph – mixer (2, 3, 5, 13, 15), recording arranger (3)
 Wez Clarke – mixer (4)
 MK – mixer (6, 11), engineer (3, 11), recording engineer (9)
 Topic – mixer (7)
 Ed Sokolowski – mixer (8)
 Mark Stent – mixer (9)
 Nikola Feve "Nk.F" – mixer (12, 14)
 Gemma Chester – engineer (2)
 Josh Green – engineer (2)
 Lucas Nord – engineer (3)
 Lewis Shay Jankel – engineer (4)
 Billen Ted – engineer (8)
 Oscar Hill – engineer (10)
 Ross Fortune – engineer (13)
 Tom AD Fuller – engineer (13)
 Ryan Ashley – vocal engineer (13)
 Ewan Vickery – assistant mixer (6, 11)

Charts

Weekly charts

Year-end charts

Certifications

References

2021 debut albums
Becky Hill albums
Polydor Records albums